Meghna Group of Industries (MGI) is one of the largest Bangladeshi industrial conglomerates. The industries under this conglomerate include chemicals, cement, consumer products, real estate, insurance, securities, utilities etc.

History 
Meghna Group traces it's origins to Kamal Trading Company which was established in 1976 by Mostafa Kamal. It expanded through the establishment of Meghna Vegetable Oil Industries Limited in 1989.

In 1996, Meghna Group established the Bangladesh National Insurance Company Limited.

Meghna Group established United Fibre Industries Limited in 1999.

In 2001, Meghna Group established United Feeds Limited to produce poultry feed.

Meghna Group established Tanveer Polymer Industries Limited in 2002.

Meghna Group established Tasnim Chemical Complex Limited and  Everest CNG Refueling & Conversion Limited in 2009.

Meghna Group founded Meghna Aviation Limited in 2011 as a helicopter rental service. It established Ekattor TV in 2011.

In 2016, Meghna Group announced plans to build a PVC factory in Meghna Economic Zone, the first private economic zone in Bangladesh.

Meghna Group launched Sonargaon Steel Fabricate Limited in 2017. Meghna Sugar Refinery Limited received 82 million USD loan from a consortium of German Development Finance Institution, FMO, Oesterreichische Entwicklungsbank AG, and the Islamic Corporation for the Development of the Private Sector. It announced a 300 million USD investment in Meghnaghat economic zone to build 11 new manufacturing units.

In 2021, Meghna Group established Fresh Ceramics with a five billion BDT investment in Ashariar Char to build the manufacturing unit. It launched two transport ships, MV Meghna Adventure and MV Meghna Princess.

In April 2022, Meghna Group announced plans to build Cumilla Economic Zone at a 250 acre site with a 1.2 billion BDT investment.

In 2023, Meghna Group invested 7 billion BDT to establish a rice mill and a rice bran oil plant in Bogra District.

In 2023, MGI adds four new oceangoing vessels to fleet.

Subsidiaries
 Fresh (fast moving consumer goods)
 Meghna Vegetable Oil Industries Limited
 Meghna Sugar Refinery Limited
 Meghna Beverage
 Unique Cement Fiber Industries
 Fresh Cement
 Sonargaon Steel Fabricate Limited
 Sonargaon Green Concrete Bricks and Blocks
 Kamal Trading Company
 Fresh Ceramics
 Tasnim Chemical Complex Limited
 Meghna PVC Limited
 Meghna Economic Zone
 Meghna Industrial Economic Zone Limited
 Cumilla Economic Zone
 Everest CNG Refueling & Conversion Limited
 MGI Transport and Logistics
 Fresh LPG
 Meghna Power
 Meghna Pulp & Paper Mills Limited
 Fresh exercise books
 Fresh Paper
 Meghna Ballpen & Accessories Mfg. Limited
 Sonargaon Printing & Packaging Industries Limited
 Meghna Foil Packaging Limited
 Fresh Happy Nappy Diaper
 United Feeds Limited
 Soya Bean & Rape Seed processing plant
 Meghna Seeds Crushing Mills Limited
 United Fibre Industries Limited
 Tanveer Polymer Industries Limited
 Meghna Aviation Limited
 Meghna Shipping
 Bangladesh National Insurance Company Limited
 Dhaka Securities Limited
 Meghna Hotel and Resorts
 The Central Hospital Limited
 The Barakah General Hospital Limited
 Meghna Information Technology
 Meghna Properties Limited
 Ekkator Television

See also
 List of companies of Bangladesh

References

External links
 MGI information

Conglomerate companies of Bangladesh
Bangladeshi companies established in 1976